Oriel Boys' High School is a government school located Chisipite, a suburb of Harare, Zimbabwe. It was established in 1961 based on the British model of education, offering GCE Ordinary and Advanced Level certification in preparation for University education. It's a boys school, with a neighboring sister school, Oriel Girls High School.

Trivia 
It has been used as a polling station for both local elections in 2010 and national elections five years later. The school is perhaps best known for having played and lost a football match in which the school-boy team was defeating by an opposing team which consisted of much older players; in one case an opposing team's player was thirty-four years old.

Notable alumni 

 Andy Flower, cricketer
 Malvin Chiwanga, entrepreneur, CEO of Matrix Petroleum
 Albert Alan Owen, composer

Website 
http://www.orielboyshigh.ac.zw/

References

Schools in Harare